Peoria Air National Guard Base, located in Peoria County, Illinois, is the base of the 182d Airlift Wing (182 AW), an Air Mobility Command (AMC)-gained unit of the Illinois Air National Guard and "host" wing for the installation. Located at Peoria International Airport, at this joint civil-military airport.

Overview
The 182d Airlift Wing air mobility mission is the ability to rapidly move personnel and equipment anywhere in the world when needed, and to sustain that force for as long as needed. This will include the strategic airlift of personnel and cargo, tactical airdrop of personnel, equipment and supplies and the transport of litters and ambulatory patients during aeromedical evacuations when required.

The wing's C-130H3 Hercules primarily performs the tactical portion of the airlift mission. The aircraft is capable of operating from rough, dirt strips and is the prime transport for airdropping troops and equipment into hostile areas.

Units
The 182d Airlift Wing consists of the following units:
 182d Operations Group
 169th Airlift Squadron
 182nd Air Support Operations Group
 168th Air Support Operations Squadron
 169th Air Support Operations Squadron
 264th Combat Communications Squadron
 566th Air Force Band

Base Commander
 Colonel Daniel R. McDonough - November 2017 – Present

See also

 List of USAF Aerospace Defense Command General Surveillance Radar Stations

References

Military installations in Illinois
Installations of the United States Air National Guard